Andrew McDonald "Mac" Wilson (9 July 1914 – 9 August 2017) was an Australian rules footballer who played with Carlton in the Victorian Football League (VFL). He was the second Carlton player to reach 100 years of age and was the oldest living person to have played in the VFL/AFL at the time of his death.

Notes

External links 

Mac Wilson's profile at Blueseum

1914 births
2017 deaths
Carlton Football Club players
Australian rules footballers from Victoria (Australia)
Australian centenarians
Men centenarians
Royal Australian Air Force personnel of World War II